State Route 369 (SR 369), also known as N Washington Avenue, is a short  east-west state highway located entirely in the city of Brownsville, Tennessee.

Route description

SR 369 begins just north of downtown at an intersection with SR 54 (N Washington Avenue/Thornton Road). It goes east past various businesses, neighborhoods, and then doctors offices and pharmacies, where it pass by the Haywood Park Community Hospital. The highway then comes to an end shortly thereafter at an intersection with US 70A/US 79/SR 76 (Dupree Street/N Washington Avenue). The entire route of SR 369 is a two-lane highway.

History

The entire route of SR 369 follows part of the former route of US 70A/US 79 through downtown.

Major intersections

References

369
Transportation in Haywood County, Tennessee
U.S. Route 70
U.S. Route 79